Hilarigona obscurata is a species of fly in the family Empididae.

References

Empididae
Insects described in 1909
Taxa named by Mario Bezzi
Diptera of South America